Roger le Rouse was Archdeacon of Totnes during 1297.

References

Archdeacons of Totnes